BBC Sessions is an album of BBC studio recordings by the band Cocteau Twins released in 1999 by Bella Union in the UK and Rykodisc in the USA. The album spanned the band's career from the early 1980s through the 1990s. Much of the first disk was taken from a series of early 1980s Peel sessions. The second disk contained several tracks recorded during the group's performance on the 1980s Radio 1 series Saturday Live. The compilation peaked at No. 87 on the UK Albums Chart.

Track listing

Disc one
 John Peel Session, 15 July 1982
 "Wax and Wane" – 3:50
 "Garlands" – 4:19
 "Alas Dies Laughing" – 3:29
 "Feathers-Oar-Blades" – 2:19

 John Peel Session, 31 January 1983
  "Hearsay Please" – 4:23
 "Dear Heart" – 3:37
 "Blind Dumb Deaf" – 3:41
 "Hazel" – 3:22

 John Peel Session, 4 October 1983
  "The Tinderbox (Of A Heart)" – 4:46
 "Strange Fruit" (Billie Holiday cover written by Abel Meeropol) – 1:52
 "Hitherto" – 3:57
 "From the Flagstones" – 3:32

 Kid Jensen Session, 10 October 1983
  "Sugar Hiccup" – 3:41
 "In Our Angelhood" – 3:56
 "My Hue and Cry" – 3:02 (Previously unreleased)
 "Musette and Drums" – 4:11

Disc two
 Saturday Live, 3 December 1983
 "Hitherto" – 3:56
 "From the Flagstones" – 3:55
 "Musette and Drums" – 3:33

 John Peel Session, 5 September 1984
  "Pepper-Tree" – 4:12
 "Beatrix" – 4:06
 "Ivo" – 3:03
 "Otterley" – 3:34

 Mark Radcliffe Session, 12 March 1996
  "Serpentskirt" – 4:29
 "Golden-Vein" – 3:46
 "Half-Gifts" – 2:44
 "Seekers Who Are Lovers" – 3:50

 Robert Elms Session, 10 April 1996
  "Calfskin Smack" – 4:23
 "Fifty-Fifty Clown" – 4:27
 "Violaine" – 3:47

Personnel
 Producer – Barry Anthony Andrews (tracks: 2-4 to 2-7), Dale Griffin (tracks: 1-5 to 1-8, 1-13 to 1-16), Jim Lahat (tracks: 2-12 to 2-14), John Owen Williams (tracks: 1-1 to 1-4), John Walters (tracks: 1-9 to 1-12), Lis Roberts (tracks: 2-8 to 2-11), Mark Radcliffe (tracks: 2-1 to 2-3), Suzanne Gilfilian (tracks: 2-12 to 2-14)
 Engineer – Dave Dade (tracks: 1-1 to 1-4), Harry Parker (tracks: 1-5 to 1-8), Lincoln Fong (tracks: 2-8 to 2-11), Mike Engles (tracks: 1-1 to 1-4, 1-13 to 1-16), Nick Gomm (tracks: 2-4 to 2-7), Paul Strudwick (tracks: 2-12 to 2-14)

References 

Cocteau Twins albums
Cocteau Twins
1999 live albums
1999 compilation albums
Rykodisc compilation albums
Rykodisc live albums
Albums with cover art by Russell Mills (artist)